The 1984 United States presidential election in Tennessee took place on November 6, 1984. All 50 states and the District of Columbia, were part of the 1984 United States presidential election. Tennessee voters chose 11 electors to the Electoral College, which selected the president and vice president of the United States. Tennessee was won by incumbent United States President Ronald Reagan of California, who was running against former Vice President Walter Mondale of Minnesota. Reagan ran for a second time with incumbent Vice President and former C.I.A. Director George H. W. Bush of Texas, and Mondale ran with Representative Geraldine Ferraro of New York, the first major female candidate for the vice presidency. Mondale performed better in Tennessee than any of the other states that were part of the Confederacy.  

The presidential election of 1984 was a very partisan election for Tennessee, with over 99% of the electorate voting only either Democratic or Republican, though several other parties appeared on the ballot. Only four counties failed to give either Reagan or Mondale an outright majority: Warren, Henry, and Hardeman Counties gave Mondale a plurality, and Dickson County gave Reagan a plurality. Reagan's best county was Johnson County, which gave him 79.10% of its vote; Mondale's was Houston County, which gave him 65.52%.

Reagan carried Tennessee by a landslide margin of 16.3%. As in many other Southern states, this was a dramatic reversal from 1980, when Reagan carried Tennessee over Southerner Jimmy Carter by less than 1%. That said, this is actually the last presidential election to date in which Tennessee voted more Democratic than the nation at large, with Reagan's national margin of victory being roughly 2% larger. It was the only former Confederate state to be more Democratic than the nation in 1984, and the only one to give Reagan less than 60% of its vote.

Reagan carried every population center in the state. He narrowly won the state's two largest counties, typically Democratic Shelby (Memphis) and Davidson (Nashville), and got over 60% of the vote in typically Republican Knox (Knoxville) and Hamilton (Chattanooga) Counties. He also got over 60% in Rutherford County (Murfreesboro), and over 2/3 of the vote in the two largest counties in the Tri-Cities region, Sullivan and Washington. In addition, Reagan performed powerfully throughout rural East Tennessee, surpassing 70% of the vote in eight counties in the region (as well as in the emerging Nashville suburb of Williamson County), and carried most of the rural counties in more typically Democratic Middle and West Tennessee as well. 

However, Mondale was able to counter to some degree, not only by keeping the margins in Shelby and Davidson close, but by carrying a number of rural, ancestrally Democratic and secessionist counties in Middle Tennessee. In five--Houston, Grundy, Jackson, Stewart, and Humphreys--he exceeded 60%. In a number of others, he was, again, able to keep Reagan's margin of victory small; excluding Shelby and Davidson, Reagan's victory margin was under 5% in nine counties. Overall, Mondale carried 23 counties in the Volunteer State, although none cast over 12,000 votes. In contrast, Democrats have carried no more than four of Tennessee's counties in any election from 2012–– when Romney became the first Republican to exceed Reagan's '84 vote share in the state–– onward (as of 2020). However, despite Reagan's comfortable win in the state, this was the closest that Mondale came to winning a former Confederate state.

Democratic platform
Walter Mondale accepted the Democratic nomination for presidency after pulling narrowly ahead of Senator Gary Hart of Colorado and Rev. Jesse Jackson of Illinois - his main contenders during what would be a very contentious Democratic primary. During the campaign, Mondale was vocal about reduction of government spending, and, in particular, was vocal against heightened military spending on the nuclear arms race against the Soviet Union, which was reaching its peak on both sides in the early 1980s.

Taking a (what was becoming the traditional liberal) stance on the social issues of the day, Mondale advocated for gun control, the right to choose regarding abortion, and strongly opposed the repeal of laws regarding institutionalized prayer in public schools. He also criticized Reagan for his economic marginalization of the poor, stating that Reagan's reelection campaign was "a happy talk campaign," not focused on the real issues at hand.

In a very significant political move during this election, the Democratic Party nominated Representative Geraldine Ferraro to run with Mondale as Vice-President. Ferraro is the first female candidate to receive such a nomination in United States history. She said in an interview at the 1984 Democratic National Convention that this action "opened a door which will never be closed again," speaking to the role of women in politics.

Republican platform

By 1984, Reagan was very popular with voters across the nation as the President who saw them out of the economic stagflation of the early and middle 1970's, and into a period of (relative) economic stability.

The economic success seen under Reagan was politically accomplished (principally) in two ways. The first was initiation of deep tax cuts for the wealthy, and the second was a wide-spectrum of tax cuts for crude oil production and refinement, namely, with the 1980 Windfall profits tax cuts. These policies were augmented with a call for heightened military spending, the cutting of social welfare programs for the poor, and the increasing of taxes on those making less than $50,000 per year. Collectively called "Reaganomics", these economic policies were established through several pieces of legislation passed between 1980 and 1987.

These new tax policies also arguably curbed several existing tax loopholes, preferences, and exceptions, but Reaganomics is typically remembered for its trickle down effect of taxing poor Americans more than rich ones. Reaganomics has (along with legislation passed under presidents George H. W. Bush and Bill Clinton) been criticized by many analysts as "setting the stage" for economic troubles in the United States after 2007, such as the Great Recession.

Virtually unopposed during the Republican primaries, Reagan ran on a campaign of furthering his economic policies. Reagan vowed to continue his "war on drugs," passing sweeping legislation after the 1984 election in support of mandatory minimum sentences for drug possession.  Furthermore, taking a (what was becoming the traditional conservative) stance on the social issues of the day, Reagan strongly opposed legislation regarding comprehension of gay marriage, abortion, and (to a lesser extent) environmentalism, regarding the final as simply being bad for business.

Results

Results by county

See also
 Presidency of Ronald Reagan

References

Tennessee
1984
1984 Tennessee elections